Ernst Theodor Echtermeyer (12 August 1805, Bad Liebenwerda – 6 May 1844) was a German writer and philosopher. Together with Arnold Ruge, in 1838, he founded the Hallische Jahrbücher für Wissenschaft und Kunst, an organ of the Young Hegelians.

References 

1805 births
1844 deaths
People from Elbe-Elster
People from the Electorate of Saxony
German philosophers
Hegelian philosophers
19th-century philosophers
19th-century German writers
19th-century German male writers